Boat Songs is the third solo album by American musician MJ Lenderman. It was released on April 29, 2022, by Dear Life Records. The album was listed on several publications' lists of the best albums of 2022.

Release

On January 25, 2022, Stereogum managing editor Chris DeVille announced the release date of the album alongside the music video for "Hangover Game," comparing the album to Jason Molina, Uncle Tupelo, and Pinegrove. In March, Stereogum senior editor Tom Breihan posted the music video for second single "TLC Cage Match." The song is named after the tables, ladders, and chairs WWE match style, which it uses as a metaphor for self-destructive behavior.

On April 29, 2022, Boat Songs was released on Dear Life Records via Bandcamp in digital form, CD, vinyl, and cassette.

Critical reception

Sasha Geffen at Pitchfork praised Lenderman's alt-country songwriting for its "disarming insights into the fray of living" delivered with fuzzy, lo-fi distortion, "loping, lackadaisical melodic phrasing," and "gentle, unhurried deadpan." Dillon Riley, writing for Flood Magazine, characterized Lenderman's writing as economical, yet low-brow compared to the more literary writing of his Wednesday bandmate Karly Hartzman. Uncut'''s Erin Osmon described Boat Songs'' with comparisons to John Prine, Neil Young and Crazy Horse, and Drive-By Truckers's Patterson Hood, praising Lenderman's "refreshing and thoroughly unpretentious perspective" that, by imbuing working-class signifiers with depth and importance, blurs the boundary between high and low art.

Year-end lists

Track listing

Personnel
Credits adapted from the album's Bandcamp release page.
 Xandy Chelmis – pedal steel
 Alex Farrar – guitar on "You Are Every Girl to Me", recording, mixing, production
 Colin Miller – production, mastering, bass, keys, trumpet
 Lewis Dahm – guitar on "You Are Every Girl to Me"
 Andrew James – writing on "Toontown", album art
 Jon Samuels – layout
 MJ Lenderman – production, all other instruments and writing

References

2022 albums
Alternative country albums by American artists